Korean-American singer-songwriter Ailee has released four studio albums, six extended plays, and twenty one singles. She has also participated in featured songs of various Korean artists, and made several soundtrack contributions.

Albums

Studio albums

Extended plays

Singles

As lead artist

Collaborations

As featured artist

Promotional singles

Soundtrack appearances

Compilation appearances

Other charted songs

Other appearances

Composition credits
All song credits are adapted from the Korea Music Copyright Association's database unless stated otherwise.

Music videos

Notes

References

Discographies of South Korean artists
Discographies of American artists
Discography
K-pop discographies